Miss Julie is a play by August Strindberg.

Miss Julie may also refer to:

Miss Julie (Rorem opera) by Ned Rorem
Miss Julie (Alwyn opera) by William Alwyn 
Julie (Boesmans opera) by Philippe Boesmans
Miss Julie (1922 film), a 1922 German silent drama film
Miss Julie (1951 film), directed by Alf Sjöberg
Miss Julie (1999 film), directed by Mike Figgis
Miss Julie (2014 film), directed by Liv Ullmann

See also
Julie (disambiguation)